This is a list of years in São Tomé and Príncipe.

20th century

21st century

See also
 History of São Tomé and Príncipe

 
São Tomé and Príncipe history-related lists
Sao Tome and Principe